This is a list of supermarket chains in Serbia.

Info has been updated, although some of it may be still incorrect.

General chains

Convenience stores

Supermarkets

Hypermarkets

Cash & Carry

Speciality store chains

Clothing

Kids clothing and toys

Cosmetics and healthcare

Home improvement and furniture

Consumer electronics

Sport equipment

Books and media

Petrol stations

Fast food

See also
List of shopping malls in Serbia

References 

 
Supermakets
Serbia